In enzymology, a glutaconate CoA-transferase is an enzyme that catalyzes the chemical reaction

acetyl-CoA + (E)-glutaconate  acetate + glutaconyl-1-CoA

Thus, the two substrates of this enzyme are acetyl-CoA and (E)-glutaconate, whereas its two products are acetate and glutaconyl-1-CoA.

This enzyme belongs to the family of transferases, specifically the CoA-transferases.  The systematic name of this enzyme class is acetyl-CoA:(E)-glutaconate CoA-transferase. This enzyme participates in styrene degradation and butanoate metabolism.

References

 

EC 2.8.3
Enzymes of unknown structure